The women's individual recurve competition at the 2015 World Archery Championships took place from 27 July to 2 August 2015 in Copenhagen, Denmark. The defending champion from the 2013 championship was Maja Jager of Denmark.

The top 8 competitors, excluding those whose countries earned team qualifying spots in the team event, earned an individual qualifying spot for their country for the 2016 Summer Olympics. Only 1 spot per country could be earned this way. An Olympic Secondary Tournament was held to rank competitors reaching the same round.

Schedule
All times are local (UTC+01:00).

Qualification round
 Bye to third round 
 Qualified for eliminations

Elimination rounds

Section 1

Section 2

Section 3

Section 4

Section 5

Section 6

Section 7

Section 8

Note: An asterisk (*) denotes a win from a one-arrow shoot-off

Finals

Note: An asterisk (*) denotes a win from a one-arrow shoot-off

Source:

References

2015 World Archery Championships
World